Palli Unnayan Academy Laboratory School and College is a school and college located in Sherpur Upazila, Bogura District, Rajshahi Division. It was founded in 1978 and is affiliated with Rural Development Academy. In 2014, its results placed in the top 20 educational institutions in Rajshahi Division.

References

High schools in Bangladesh
Schools in Bogra District
Educational institutions established in 1978
1978 establishments in Bangladesh